Çandır is a village in the Mersin Province, Turkey. It's part of Toroslar district (which is an intracity district within Mersin city). It is in the Toros Mountains. The population of the village was 307 as of 2012. The village is famous for the medieval castle to the north of the village (see Çandır Castle).

References

Villages in Toroslar District